Alphacrambus prodontellus is a moth of the family Crambidae in the genus Alphacrambus. It was described by George Hampson in 1919 and is known from South Africa and Kenya.

References

Moths described in 1919
Crambini
Moths of Africa